Joan Sastre Morro (born December 10, 1991) is a Spanish professional basketball player for Iberostar Tenerife of the Spanish Liga ACB. He is a 2.01 m (6'7") tall swingman, as he plays at both the shooting guard and small forward positions.

Professional career
Born in Inca, Balearic Islands, Spain, Sastre spent all of his youth basketball playing career on the Balearic Islands. In 2008, at the age of 17, Sastre debuted in the Spanish 2nd-tier level LEB Oro, with Bàsquet Inca, where he played two games, before signing his first professional contract with Bàsquet Mallorca.

One year later, Sastre agreed with Cajasol, where he would make his debut in the Spanish top-tier level Liga ACB, despite that he was loaned in his first year to Cajsol's affiliated team, CB Qalat of the Spanish 3rd-tier level LEB Plata.

Sastre played in Sevilla for five years, before signing with the Spanish club CAI Zaragoza. Two years later, he moved to the Spanish club Valencia Basket.

On July 2, 2021, he has signed with Lenovo Tenerife of the Spanish Liga ACB.

International career
Sastre was a member of the junior national teams of Spain. With Spain's junior national teams, he played at the 2009 FIBA Europe Under-18 Championship, the 2010 FIBA Europe Under-20 Championship, where he won a bronze medal, and he also won a gold medal at the 2011 FIBA Europe Under-20 Championship, which was held in Bilbao, while playing with the Spanish under-20 national team.

He has also been a member of the senior Spain national team. With Spain's senior team he played at the EuroBasket 2017.

References

External links
Euroleague.net Profile
FIBA Archive Profile
FIBA Europe Profile
Eurobasket.com Profile
Spanish ACB League Profile 
Spanish Federation Profile 
Twitter 

1991 births
Living people
Basket Zaragoza players
Bàsquet Mallorca players
CB Canarias players
CB Inca players
Real Betis Baloncesto players
Liga ACB players
Shooting guards
Small forwards
Spanish men's basketball players
Valencia Basket players
Sportspeople from Mallorca
People from Inca, Mallorca